Picromerite (synonyms: schoenite, schönite) is a mineral from the class of hydrous sulfates lacking additional anions, and containing medium to large cations according to the Nickel–Strunz classification.

Etymology 
The name comes from the Greek words πικρός [pikros] for "bitter" and μέρος [meros]  for "part", and relates to the bitter taste of the mineral.

Occurrence 
Picromerite is found on comparatively few places, currently (2015) only about 40 localities are known. It was first identified in active volcanic fumaroles on Mount Vesuvius by Arcangelo Scacchi in 1855 and has also been found in volcanic deposits on Mount Etna and on Hawai'i.

It is more commonly found in the kainite zones of some marine salt deposits, among them salt mines in Thuringia, Lower Saxony and Saxony-Anhalt (Germany), near Hall in Tirol, Hallstatt and Bad Ischl (Austria), near Whitby (UK), and in the Carlsbad Potash District (New Mexico), also on salt lakes in western China.

Picromerite can also form in sulfate-rich hydrothermal ore deposits and is found in slag heaps of some ore and coal mines.

Picromerite is often accompanied by anhydrite, epsomite, halite, hohmannite, kainite, metasideronatrite and metavoltine, depending on the locality.

Properties 
Picromerite dehydrates in dry air, and crystals then show dull, spherical dehydration zones. Progressive dehydration leads to leonite.

References

External links 

 

Potassium minerals
Monoclinic minerals
Minerals in space group 14
Magnesium minerals
Sulfate minerals
Evaporite